Anisha Dzombe Basheel (born 1 September 1997) is a Malawian professional boxer who has held the Commonwealth female lightweight title since 2018 and the ABU female super-featherweight title since 2017.

Professional career
Basheel made her professional debut on 5 April 2015, suffering a four round points decision loss to Ruth Chisale at the Robins Park Hall in Blantyre, Malawi.

After losing her first five fights, one by stoppage; a fourth-round technical knockout (TKO) to Lolita Muzeya in November 2015, she defeated Monalisa Sibanda by first-round TKO to score her first professional win. Basheel then won her next five fights, all by stoppage, before facing Consolata Musanga for the inaugural ABU female super-featherweight title on 2 December 2017 at the Carnivore Grounds in Nairobi, Kenya, winning via ninth-round TKO. 

For her next fight Basheel moved up in weight to face Sam Smith on 15 June 2018 at the York Hall, London, for the inaugural Commonwealth female lightweight title. Basheel became the first female to capture a Commonwealth title with a first-round TKO. Basheel dropped her opponent less than 20 seconds after the opening bell; stunning Smith with a solid left hook and following up with two right hands to score the knockdown. Smith rose to her feet to beat the referee's count of ten, only to be on the receiving end of several heavy blows. The end came 1 minute and 10 seconds into the round after a solid jab sent Smith stumbling backwards into the ropes, causing referee Marcus McDonnell to wave the fight off.

A year later, Basheel challenged undefeated WBC Silver and former IBO female lightweight champion Chantelle Cameron on 20 July 2019 at the Brentwood Centre in Brentwood, Essex. The fight was a WBC final eliminator with the winner earning a mandatory shot at the WBA, WBC, IBF, and WBO champion Katie Taylor for the undisputed lightweight title. Basheel lost the fight by a shutout unanimous decision with two judges scoring the bout 100–89 and the third scoring it 100–90, all in favour of Cameron.

Professional boxing record

References

Living people
1997 births
Malawian women boxers
Super-featherweight boxers
Lightweight boxers
African Boxing Union champions
Commonwealth Boxing Council champions
People from Lilongwe